DNA repair and recombination protein RAD54B is a protein that in humans is encoded by the RAD54B gene.

The protein encoded by this gene belongs to the DEAD-like helicase superfamily. It shares similarity with Saccharomyces cerevisiae RAD54 and RDH54, both of which are involved in homologous recombination and repair of DNA. This protein binds to double-stranded DNA, and displays ATPase activity in the presence of DNA. This gene is highly expressed in testis and spleen, which suggests active roles in meiotic and mitotic recombination. Homozygous mutations of this gene were observed in primary lymphoma and colon cancer.

Interactions
RAD54B has been shown to interact with RAD51.

Cancer

The RAD54B gene is somatically mutated or deleted in numerous types of cancer including colorectal cancer (~3.3%), breast cancer (~3.4%), and lung cancer (~2.6%).   In North America, these three cancers alone account for about 20,500 individuals diagnosed annually with RAD54B defective cancer.  In a pre-clinical study, colon cancer cells defective in RAD54B were determined to be selectively killed by inhibitors of the DNA repair protein PARP1.   Inhibitors of PARP1 likely impede alternative DNA repair responses that might otherwise compensate for loss of the RAD54B pathway in cancer cells.  Thus RAD54B-deficient cancer cells treated with a PARP1 inhibitor are apparently more vulnerable to killing by naturally occurring DNA damages than non-cancerous cells without a RAD54 defect (see article Synthetic lethality).

References

Further reading